Jules Mutebutsi, also known as Jules Mutebusi and Jules Mutebuzi, (c. 1960 – 9 May 2014) was a Congolese military person and rebel leader of the Rally for Congolese Democracy. He has been often described as a Rwandan proxy. Mutebutsi was captured in 2004 and was put on trial for treason. He was soon sentenced to exile. He would remain in exile until his death in 2014.

Career
Mutebutsi was a Munyamulenge from South Kivu Province.

On 26 May 2004 Mutebutsi together with Laurent Nkunda captured the city of Bukavu. Both were soldiers in the military of the Democratic Republic of the Congo. They cited they wished to protect the Banyamulenge population in the DRC. During their occupation of the city Amnesty International called on the two to make their troops observe human rights after violations had occurred. On 9 June they withdrew after they were defeated by government troops, Mutebutsi fled to Rwanda, together with 300 troops. He held the rank of Colonel at the time of his escape to Rwanda. Mutebutsi said he fled towards Rwanda because Congolese and United Nations troops were trying to kill him. He remained in exile and under house arrest in Rwanda.

Mutebutsi died in a Kigali hospital from an illness, aged 54. Prior to his death Mutebutsi had voiced concern over his safety, as he had not supported the March 23 Movement.

References

1960s births
2014 deaths
People from South Kivu
Democratic Republic of the Congo exiles
Democratic Republic of the Congo politicians
21st-century Democratic Republic of the Congo people